Antonie van Leeuwenhoek is a peer-reviewed scientific journal covering microbiology published by Springer Science+Business Media. The journal was established in 1934 and is published monthly. The editor-in-chief is Mike Jetten. The journal is named after Antonie van Leeuwenhoek, considered the father of microbiology.

Abstracting and indexing
The journal is abstracted and indexed in the following bibliographic databases:

According to the Journal Citation Reports, the journal has a 2020 impact factor of 2.271.

References

External links

Microbiology journals
Springer Science+Business Media academic journals
Monthly journals
English-language journals
Publications established in 1934
Antonie van Leeuwenhoek